Vasylko Romanovych (1203–1269), Prince of Belz (1207–1269), Prince of Brest (1231–1269), and Prince of Volhynia (1231–1269).

He was the son of Roman the Great and Anna-Euphrosyne, and the younger brother of Daniel of Galicia (Danylo). After Roman's death in 1205, the Galician boyars drove him, his mother and his brother from the region.

Family
Parents

Roman the Great
Anna-Euphrosyne

Siblings

Daniel of Galicia (1201–1264)

Children

 Volodymyr Vasylkovych
 Olha

References

Sources
 

1203 births
1269 deaths
People from Galicia–Volhynia
Romanovichi family
Eastern Orthodox monarchs
Princes of Volhynia
Angelid dynasty